John Ivatt Briscoe (12 October 1791 – 16 August 1870) was an English Whig and later Liberal politician who sat in the House of Commons from 1857 to 1870.

Early life and education
Briscoe was the only son of John Briscoe of Cross Deep, Twickenham and his wife Mary Winthrop, daughter of Stephen Winthrop. He inherited the family home, Cross Deep House in 1809. He was educated at University College, Oxford and graduated BA 2nd class in classics in 1812 and MA in 1815. He entered as a student at Lincoln's Inn, but was not called to the bar. Briscoe married Anna Maria Mawbey, daughter of Sir Joseph Mawbey, 2nd Baronet, in 1819.

Judicial career
He was a Deputy Lieutenant and J.P. for Surrey and a J.P. for Middlesex. He wrote a pamphlet on "Prison Discipline."

Parliamentary career
At the 1830 general election Briscoe was elected as a Member of Parliament (MP) for Surrey. He  held the seat until it was divided under the Reform Act, and was then elected at the 1832 general election as an MP for East Surrey, but was defeated at the 1835 election. He was returned to the Commons at the next general election, in 1837 as the MP for  Westbury, where he defeated the sitting Conservative MP Sir Ralph Lopes by 98 votes to 96. He held that seat  until the general election in June 1841, when he did not contest the seat.  Briscoe did not stand for Parliament again until the 1857 general election, when he was elected as an MP for West Surrey. He held the seat until his death aged 78 in 1870.

Legacy
He upkept and improved Foxhills which he inherited through marriage, from an 11-year owner and neighbouring friend, purchaser of its eponymous owner Charles James Fox (d. 1806).  His will in rounded bands, left "less than" .  Its execution in 1870 confirms he died 'late of' Foxhills, Chertsey and Eaton Place (Belgravia).

References

Bibliography

External links

1791 births
1870 deaths
Whig (British political party) MPs for English constituencies
Liberal Party (UK) MPs for English constituencies
UK MPs 1868–1874
UK MPs 1857–1859
UK MPs 1859–1865
UK MPs 1865–1868
Alumni of University College, Oxford
Members of Lincoln's Inn
Deputy Lieutenants of Surrey
UK MPs 1830–1831
UK MPs 1831–1832
UK MPs 1832–1835
UK MPs 1837–1841
English justices of the peace